Heil is a surname. Notable people with the surname include:
Bob Heil (born 1940), inventor and founder of Heil Sound
Hubertus Heil (born 1972), German politician
Jennifer Heil (born 1983), Canadian freestyle skier
Johannes Heil (born 1978), German music producer
John Heil (born 1943), American philosopher
Julius P. Heil (1876-1949), 30th governor of the State of Wisconsin
Mechthild Heil (born 1961), German politician
Oskar Heil (1908-1994), inventor of the air motion transformer
Reinhold Heil (born 1954), German-American composer